Neil "Nello" Baldwin BEM (born 15 March 1946) is an honorary graduate of Keele University from Westlands in Newcastle-under-Lyme, Staffordshire, England. He is a registered clown and also worked for Stoke City Football Club, for whom he once played briefly in a friendly match. He is the subject of an award-winning BBC television drama, Marvellous, which was broadcast in 2014, and a play of the same name which was performed in London's West End in 2022.

Personal life 
Born to Harry and Mary Baldwin on 15 March 1946, he was diagnosed with a learning disability as a child and required speech therapy. Baldwin left school at age 16 to join Sir Robert Fossett's Circus, the oldest circus in England, for whom he performed as Nello the Clown for three seasons. He lived with his mother until a few years before she died in 2003. He is known to be acquainted with the Archbishop of Canterbury, the footballer Gary Lineker, magician’s assistant Debbie McGee and Prince Edward.

Keele University 
Since 1960, unasked and unpaid, Baldwin has visited Keele University, where his mother worked as a cleaner, to greet new students. A testimonial football match, on 12 March 2000, featured his own team of Keele University students (the Neil Baldwin Football Club, formed in 1967, whose president was Gary Lineker) against an all-star side of former Football League players including Lou Macari, Asa Hartford and Gordon Cowans.

He was granted honorary life membership of Keele University Students' Union in 1968. The proposal received unanimous support. His fiftieth year there was marked with a two-day celebration, including a service of thanksgiving presided over by the Bishop of Lichfield, Keele alumnus Jonathan Gledhill, and a further testimonial match. He was also awarded honorary alumni-hood.

In 2013 Baldwin received the honorary degree of Master of the University from Keele University, which said that he

In 2016, Stoke City FC and Keele University combined to celebrate Neil Baldwin's 70th birthday at Keele Hall. Guests included friends and family, professional footballers and football administrators, members of the clergy, professional actors and screenwriters, impresarios of the circus, Keele University professors, students and graduates, local dignitaries, singers from the Neil Baldwin Choir, three Cambridge University Boat Club rowers, and members of the Neil Baldwin Football Club. The highlight was a birthday greeting by video-link from Sir Alex Ferguson. Vice-Chancellor Professor Trevor McMillan remarked that "Only Neil could bring together people from such diverse walks of life to celebrate his birthday".

Stoke City FC
In the 1990s Baldwin was appointed as Stoke City Football Club kit-man by then manager Lou Macari who has described him as "the best signing I ever made", as his humour was so good for team morale. In 1993, Macari played him as a substitute for Stoke City, against Aston Villa, in the final five minutes of a testimonial match for Gordon Cowans. Macari later wrote seven pages about Baldwin in his 2009 autobiography, Football, My Life, and said that he is a "man without an angle and there aren't many of them in football". In May 2015 Baldwin was awarded "Supporter of the year" by Stoke City FC.

Marvellous TV film 
Baldwin is the subject of and also appeared as himself in Marvellous, an acclaimed 2014 biographical film in which he is played by Toby Jones, whom The Guardian praised for his "lovely, very human, performance". It was first broadcast on BBC Two and BBC Two HD on 25 September 2014. Reviewing it for the Stoke Sentinel, John Woodhouse said:

The film won the 2015 BAFTA Television Award for "Best Single Drama", and Gemma Jones won the award for Best Supporting Actress for her portrayal of Baldwin's mother. Toby Jones was nominated for the Best Actor award for his performance. Baldwin collected the drama award trophy during the ceremony at the Theatre Royal on Drury Lane, and made an acceptance speech.

Marvellous book 
Baldwin's autobiography, Marvellous: Neil Baldwin – My Story, written with the help of Keele University alumni Malcolm Clarke and Francis Beckett, was published in hardback by John Blake in August 2015.

Marvellous play 
A stage version of Neil Baldwin's story premiered in March 2022 at the New Vic Theatre in Newcastle-under-Lyme and, later that year, transferred to @sohoplace in  London's West End.

Other honours 
On 21 May 2015 Baldwin was presented with the Freedom of Stoke-on-Trent and on 26 November 2015 was awarded the freedom of Newcastle-under-Lyme. In October 2015, he featured in an episode of the BBC television programme Songs of Praise.

Baldwin was awarded a British Empire Medal (BEM) in the 2019 New Year Honours "for services to the community in Newcastle-Under-Lyme, Staffordshire".

References

External links 
Neil Baldwin FC: official website
Malcolm Clarke: "Mellow Nello", 1995
 Mike Walters: "Wally meets Neil Baldwin: How Nello went from clown to Stoke City kitman and 'Lord Baldwin of Keele'", Daily Mirror, 15 August 2015
Neil Baldwin's Marvellous Interview, Keele University, 22 September 2014
Peter Bowker: "Writing the "Marvellous" life story of Neil Baldwin", Writers Room , BBC, 22 September 2014
 Susanna Lazarus: "10 exciting things Neil Baldwin has done since Marvellous", Radio Times, 25 December 2014
BBC page on Marvellous

1946 births
Living people
English clowns
People associated with Keele University
People from Newcastle-under-Lyme
Recipients of the British Empire Medal
Sportspeople from Stoke-on-Trent
Stoke City F.C. non-playing staff